Haskell Robert "Cool Papa" Sadler (April 16, 1935 – May 6, 1994) was an American blues singer, songwriter, and guitarist.

Born in Denver, Colorado, United States, Sadler moved to California and worked in clubs in the San Francisco Bay Area starting in the 1960s. He played a number of times at the San Francisco Blues Festival.  Sadler wrote "747" as recorded by Joe Louis Walker, and "Yesterday" recorded by Tiny Powell.  In the 1970s, he recorded as "Cool Papa" for TJ Records. Cool Papa proved to be a guiding hand to Gene "Birdlegg" Pittman, then a new arrival in the Bay Area, and Pittman played alongside Sadler for 13 years.

He developed diabetes, and had a leg amputated in 1990.   He died, aged 59, in Berkeley, California, in 1994.

See also
West Coast blues

References

External links
Cool Papa photos

1935 births
1994 deaths
American blues singers
American blues guitarists
American male guitarists
West Coast blues musicians
20th-century American singers
20th-century American guitarists
Singers from Denver
Guitarists from Colorado
20th-century American male musicians
American male singer-songwriters
Singer-songwriters from Colorado